Dimension Films is an American film production company owned by Lantern Entertainment. It was formerly used as Harvey and Bob Weinstein's label within Miramax, which was acquired by The Walt Disney Company on June 30, 1993, to produce and release independent films and genre titles, specifically horror and science fiction films.

The Weinsteins took the Dimension label with them when they separated from Miramax on October 1, 2005 and paired it under their new company, The Weinstein Company (TWC). Dimension Films was one of the American "mini-majors", i.e. small to medium independent television and motion picture production studios.

All films released by Dimension Films before 2005 (which are shared by Miramax) are currently owned and distributed by Paramount Pictures through Paramount Global's acquisition of a 49% stake in Miramax that was closed on April 3, 2020; half the profits of sequels made to Miramax-era films went to The Walt Disney Studios until Miramax was sold to Filmyard Holdings, a joint venture of Colony NorthStar, Tutor-Saliba Corporation, and Qatar Investment Authority on December 3, 2010. Miramax was sold once more to the beIN Media Group on March 2, 2016.

History

1991–1992: Foundation and early releases 
The studio was officially founded in 1992 under its parent company Miramax Films by Bob Weinstein to distribute horror films and other films deemed "disreputable" for release under the Miramax title. Prior to 1992, the Weinsteins had released similar titles under a smaller operation called Millimeter Films (which most of the Millimeter Films titles are currently owned by Paramount Pictures (via Miramax)).

Dimension's first release was the sequel film Hellraiser III: Hell on Earth, released theatrically in the United States in 1992, followed by Stuart Gordon's sci-fi thriller Fortress, and the sequel Children of the Corn II: The Final Sacrifice, both released the same year.

1993–1999: Disney's acquisition of Miramax 
On June 30, 1993, The Walt Disney Studios purchased Miramax, who had been facing financial troubles between 1990 and 1992, prior to their acquisition and release of The Crying Game, which earned the company US$60 million. The success of The Crying Game made Miramax attractive to Disney, who officially bought the company in 1993, resulting in Dimension Films becoming a Disney subsidiary.

After the box-office failure of Mother's Boys (1994) starring Jamie Lee Curtis, Dimension distributed Miramax's The Crow (1994), which would garner Dimension its first major commercial success. In 1995, Dimension acquired the rights to the Halloween film series, releasing the sixth installment Halloween: The Curse of Michael Myers in September that year. The release of From Dusk till Dawn (1996) would mark the beginning of a working relationship with director Robert Rodriguez as well as a lucrative franchise, with several sequels to follow.

Dimension would gain greater exposure with its distribution of Wes Craven's Scream, released on December 20, 1996, which became a major box office hit, grossing $173 million worldwide. The company also produced and distributed its sequel, Scream 2, released the following year, which grossed a comparable $172 million.

The company continued its trend of releasing horror and science fiction films, specifically films aimed at teenagers and young adult audiences, with the releases of Phantoms (1998) and the Halloween sequel Halloween H20: 20 Years Later (1998), the latter of which garnered the company another commercial success. The company released its second film with director Robert Rodriguez, the teen sci-fi film The Faculty, on Christmas Day 1998. In 1999, Dimension distributed David Cronenberg's eXistenZ and Scream-writer Kevin Williamson's directorial debut Teaching Mrs. Tingle.

2000–2004: Post-millennium releases 
Dimension's first post-millennium release was the direct-to-video From Dusk Till Dawn 3: The Hangman's Daughter. Next was Scream 3 (2000), which was theatrically released like its predecessors. In July 2000, the company released the slasher parody film Scary Movie, which grossed a record-breaking $278 million for the company and marked the beginning of another popular film series. 2001 saw the release of the Robert Rodriguez-directed Spy Kids, which was the company's first major children's film; the film would spawn another popular franchise for the company.

Beginning in 2000, Dimension began purchasing North American distribution rights to various international productions; their 2001 release of The Others, a Spanish-produced supernatural thriller starring Nicole Kidman, was a surprise success for the company. Other international productions purchased by Dimension included two additional horror films by Spanish director Jaume Balagueró: The Nameless (1999), and Darkness (2002). Darkness received a North American theatrical release in December 2004 after being shelved for two years, and proved to be a financial success, while The Nameless was released direct-to-video in 2005. In January 2005, Dimension purchased the American distribution rights to the Australian horror film Wolf Creek, which was released in December that year.

For much of the early 2000s, Dimension produced and distributed numerous sequels to films released under their branch, including several direct-to-video releases for films such as Children of the Corn: Revelation (2001), Hellraiser: Hellseeker (2002), and Dracula III: Legacy (2005). They also distributed several comedies, such as the Terry Zwigoff-directed Bad Santa (2003), and David Zucker's My Boss's Daughter (2003).

2005–present: Separation from Miramax 
In 2005, The Weinstein brothers purchased the rights to Dimension Films from Disney, and the company officially became a subsidiary of The Weinstein Company (TWC), established the same year.

After their separation from Miramax, Dimension would co-produce several titles with Metro-Goldwyn-Mayer (MGM), including the horror remakes The Amityville Horror (2005), Black Christmas (2006), and Halloween (2007), as well as the Stephen King-based thrillers 1408 and The Mist (both 2007). In the spring of 2007, Dimension produced and distributed the joint-double feature film Grindhouse, directed by Robert Rodriguez and Quentin Tarantino. The film was a major box office failure, grossing less than half of its $53 million budget.

In 2008, Dimension began to distribute an exclusive home video line titled Dimension Extreme, which mainly consisted of independent and international horror films, some of which were direct-to-video productions, and others foreign horror films making their home media debuts in North America.

In 2011, Scream 4, the fourth installment in the Scream series, was released, and proved to be another box office success in the franchise, earning nearly $100 million in box office receipts. The company released the sci-fi horror films Apollo 18 (2011) and Dark Skies (2013). In 2013, Dimension acquired the rights to the independent slasher film All the Boys Love Mandy Lane, shot in 2006, and gave the film a limited release in the United States in October.

Dimension partnered with MTV for the television series Scream, based on the film series. On June 24, 2019, it was announced that Scream would be moving to VH1 ahead of the third season, which Dimension did not produce. Dimension Films also has involvement with One Ball Pictures, who owns the "Funny Or Die" online series. They released their first episode, "A Lesson with John McEnroe", with Dimension Films.

In 2015, Dimension Films lost the rights to the Halloween franchise. In 2018, the company alongside TWC was purchased in a bankruptcy auction by Lantern Entertainment. On December 20, 2019, ViacomCBS (now known as Paramount Global) announced that they would acquire 49% of Miramax from beIN Media Group for at least $375 million, with Paramount Pictures gaining exclusive worldwide distribution rights to the Miramax library, including the pre-2005 Dimension films. ViacomCBS and Miramax will also co-produce new content based on titles from the Miramax library. The deal closed on April 3, 2020.

Home media 
The pre-2005 Dimension films were originally released to home video through Buena Vista Home Entertainment (under the Hollywood Pictures label in some places) while Miramax was owned by Disney. After Disney sold Miramax to Filmyard in 2010, they were distributed from 2011 to 2020 on home video through Lionsgate (with the exception of the UK rights to The Brothers Grimm and The Amityville Horror, which Disney secretly acquired from Miramax in 2015, although left unconfirmed to the public, while the same films is co-owned by Amazon via MGM elsewhere), with Echo Bridge Home Entertainment briefly handling some as well. Through ViacomCBS' 49% stake in Miramax, Paramount Home Entertainment acquired the home video distribution rights to the pre-2005 Dimension titles (not including the overseas rights to The Brothers Grimm (expect for Japan (which kept by Paramount))).

As of 2015, the post-2005 Dimension Films titles (which apart from The Amityville Horror as of 2020) are currently released on DVD and Blu-ray by Lionsgate through Anchor Bay Entertainment, under The Weinstein Company, due to the Weinsteins' previous ownership of 25% of Starz Media, which was Anchor Bay's parent. Before the transaction, they were distributed by Genius Products and Sony Pictures Home Entertainment.

Dimension Extreme 
Beginning in 2008, Dimension introduced the Dimension Extreme label, which released primarily international and indie horror titles on DVD. A film like the grindhouse-esque Triloquist of 2008 is an example.

Filmography

Primary owners and distributors

Past owners and distributors 
 Miramax Films(1992–2010 for films released before late 2005, under Buena Vista Pictures ownership from 1993 to 2010)
 The Weinstein Company(2005–2018 for films released from late 2005 to 2019)
 Metro-Goldwyn-Mayer (2006–2008)
 Genius Products (2006–2009)
 Vivendi Entertainment (2009–2010)
 Sony Pictures (2010–2011)
 Anchor Bay Entertainment (2011–2017)
 Lionsgate and Echo Bridge Home Entertainment(2011–2014 for films released before late 2005 via Miramax through separate deals, Lionsgate gained Echo Bridge titles and released them from 2014 to 2020, Lionsgate also distributed films released from late 2005 to 2019 via The Weinstein Company through its acquisition of Anchor Bay's parent company Starz Inc.)

Current owners and distributors 
 Paramount Pictures(via Miramax ownership since 2020 for films released before late 2005)
 Lantern Entertainment, Lionsgate and Studio Distribution Services, LLC. (Warner Bros. and Universal Pictures)(via Spyglass Media Group ownership since 2021 for films released from late 2005 to 2019, film catalog acquired by Lantern in 2018, then transferred to Spyglass in 2019, partial stakes in Spyglass acquired by Warner and Lionsgate in 2019 and 2021, respectively)
 Entertainment One
 Alliance Films (spun out from Alliance Atlantis)
 RLJE Films
 Shout! Factory

See also 
 Screen Gems, a subsidiary of Sony Pictures that similarly specializes in genre films.
 Paramount Pictures
 Miramax
 The Weinstein Company
 Lantern Entertainment
 Bob Weinstein

References

Works cited 
 
 

Film production companies of the United States
Companies based in New York City
Former subsidiaries of The Walt Disney Company
Miramax
The Weinstein Company
Mass media companies established in 1992
Defunct film and television production companies of the United States
Mass media companies disestablished in 2019
1992 establishments in New York City
Lantern Entertainment
American independent film studios
Former Viacom subsidiaries
Former Lionsgate subsidiaries